Elysius deceptura is a moth of the family Erebidae. It was described by Herbert Druce in 1905. It is found in Peru.

References

deceptura
Moths described in 1905
Moths of South America